Vice Admiral David Willoughby Leach,  (17 July 1928 –19 January 2020) was a senior officer of the Royal Australian Navy, who served as Chief of the Naval Staff from 1982 to 1985.

Early life
Leach was born in Subiaco, Western Australia, on 17 July 1928 to John Digby Leach, a First World War veteran and later Commissioner of Main Roads in Western Australia, and his wife Grace Lilian. Initially educated at Perth Modern School, Leach entered the Royal Australian Naval College in January 1942 aged thirteen.

Naval career
Leach commanded the guided missile destroyers  and HMAS Perth during the Vietnam War for which he was appointed a Commander of the Order of the British Empire in 1969. In 1970 he managed naval liaison for the Royal Visit to Australia for which he was appointed a Lieutenant of the Royal Victorian Order.

He was appointed Flag Officer Commanding HM Australian Fleet in 1979 and Chief of the Naval Staff in 1982. He was made a Companion of the Order of Australia in June 1984, and retired in 1985.

After retiring from the Navy, Leach joined the Council of the Australian War Memorial and became a member of the Administrative Appeals Tribunal. He was also elected as an alderman in the Municipality of Woollahra, and served as mayor during 1995. Leach died in Sydney on 19 January 2020.

References

1928 births
2020 deaths
Australian military personnel of the Vietnam War
Commanders of the Order of the British Empire
Companions of the Order of Australia
Graduates of the Royal Australian Naval College
Lieutenants of the Royal Victorian Order
People educated at Perth Modern School
People from Perth, Western Australia
Royal Australian Navy admirals
Mayors of Woollahra